Bobby Eli  is an American musician, arranger, composer and record producer from Philadelphia. He is a founding member and lead guitarist of Philadelphia studio band MFSB.

Overview
A multi-instrumentalist, producer, songwriter and arranger, Eli's contributions can be heard on recordings by many artists, including Teddy Pendergrass,  The Jacksons, Chris Brown, David Bowie,  Jay-Z,   Hall and Oates,  Patti LaBelle,  Elton John,  Phyllis Hyman,  B.B. King,  Billy Paul,  Wilson Pickett,  George Clinton,  The Spinners, The Temptations, The Stylistics, The Trammps,  Curtis Mayfield, The Sapphires and Shaggy. He was a regular session player for Gamble & Huff's Philadelphia International label in the 1970s.

His credits as a songwriter include million-selling singles, "Love Won't Let Me Wait", by Major Harris (#1 R&B, #5 pop, 1975), which he also produced and arranged; "Just Don't Want To Be Lonely" by the Main Ingredient (#8 R&B, #10 pop, 1974); and Blue Magic's "Sideshow" (#1 R&B, #8 pop, 1974), as well as "Three Ring Circus" (#5 R&B, #36 pop, 1974) for the same group.   He is credited with the success of Jackie Moore's #1 disco-dance classic, "This Time Baby"  and co-wrote the song by Fat Larry's Band, "Zoom", which climbed to #2 in the UK charts in 1982.

He has also produced, arranged and performed on hit singles for Harold Melvin & The Blue Notes, William "Poogie" Hart of The Delfonics, The Whispers, Regina Belle, Engelbert Humperdinck, The Dells, Isaac Hayes and Sister Sledge. He has produced two albums for Atlantic Starr, and  Rose Royce; and also Deniece Williams' Grammy-nominated album, Love Niecy Style in 2007.

Career
In 1980, Eli collaborated with Len Stark of Melron Records to record a tribute to the families of the Iran hostage crisis hostages. They recorded a single "American Message To The Hostages" which was released on Melron 5040 in 1980.

In 2007, Eli helped to unite three of Philly's most successful lead singers, William Hart of The Delfonics, Ted Mills from Blue Magic, and Russell Thompkins, Jr. of the Stylistics.  The project was billed as the "Legendary Tenors of Soul" and featured the three vocalists alternating leads on mostly soul standards.  Eli recruited Hall & Oates to join the soul trio for an original track on the CD, All The Way From Philadelphia.

In 2006, Eli opened his own recording facility, "The Grooveyard", in the Philadelphia suburbs. He is currently producing his two new discoveries, a 16-year-old blue-eyed soul singer from Boston, Massachusetts, Dennis "Youngblood" Taylor and female singer, Debra Michaels.

In September 2008 he jointly co wrote (Dixon/Eli/Green), recorded at "The Grooveyard" studio and released with UK song writer/producer Carl Dixon two songs namely 'Soul Recession' by Philly harmony group Double Exposure and 'There I go falling in love again' by Chiquita Green. Chiquita also co wrote these songs with Eli and Dixon. Eli and some other original Salsoul/Philly/TSOP (The Sound of Philadelphia)/MFSB (Gamble and Huff) session musicians played on this session, including Earl Young, Dennis Harris, T.G. Conway, Jimmie Williams and Rikki Hicks. Jimmy Williams died in October 2016.

He launched his own label, Groove City Entertainment.

In 2016, Eli was inducted into the Musicians Hall of Fame and Museum.

Current projects
Current and recent projects written, produced and arranged by Bobby Eli include recordings with El Debarge, Stevie Wonder and Red Hot Chili Peppers. He is producing the new CD for funkmaster George Clinton.  Eli has contributed as a guitarist, arranger, and member of MFSB to the "A Soulful Tale of Two Cities" album project, which joins artists from Motown and Philadelphia International Records.

Discography
He played electric guitar on three tracks on Benny Golson's album, Killer Joe (Columbia, 1977)

References

 

Living people
American soul guitarists
American male guitarists
Record producers from Pennsylvania
Songwriters from Pennsylvania
Grammy Award winners
Place of birth missing (living people)
Guitarists from Philadelphia
20th-century American guitarists
20th-century American male musicians
American male songwriters
MFSB members
Salsoul Orchestra members
Year of birth missing (living people)